V25, V-25 or V.25 may refer to:

 NEC V25, the microcontroller version of the NEC V20 processor
 Fokker V.17, a version of which was called the "V.25", was an experimental German aircraft designed in the 1910s
 V25-class torpedo boat, a class of torpedo boat built for the Imperial German Navy in the 1910s
 SMS V25, the lead ship of said class

and also:

 ITU-T V-Series Recommendations, a type of modem connection